Soviet submarine K-3 was a K-class submarine of the Soviet Navy during World War II.

Operational history 
At first located in the Baltic Sea, she was relocated to the Northern Fleet on 8 November 1941. She engaged enemy shipping with torpedoes, with gunfire, and as minelayer.

On 3 December 1941, after a failed torpedo attack, K-3 was damaged by depth charges from the German submarine chasers UJ-1403, UJ-1416, and UJ-1708. K-3 was forced to surface and engaged in a gun battle the three attacking units, sinking UJ-1708 and forcing the other two ships to withdraw.

Loss 
K-3 was sunk on 21 March 1943 by depth charges from the German submarine chasers UJ-1102, UJ-1106, and UJ-1111.

K-3 is the fifteenth-highest-scoring Soviet submarine (not counting ships sunk by mines she laid), with 9,048 GRT sunk.

References

1938 ships
Ships built in the Soviet Union
Soviet K-class submarines
World War II submarines of the Soviet Union
Maritime incidents in December 1941
Maritime incidents in March 1943
Lost submarines of the Soviet Union